Ryan Singel is a San Francisco-based blogger and journalist covering tech business, tech policy, civil liberty and privacy issues. His work has appeared extensively in Wired.com, and Singel co-founded the Threat Level blog with journalist and convicted hacker Kevin Lee Poulsen. As of 2008, he began covering tech business news for "Wired.com"'s Epicenter blog.

Singel has covered issues of government monitoring, and has been a chronicler of AT&T's alleged involvement in the NSA warrantless surveillance controversy. Involvement by Wired News in the case has been criticized by federal authorities.

Singel also founded a copy editing company called The Universal Desk in 2009.

In 2012, Singel left his job at Wired to run the startup called Contextly, an engagement platform for publishers.

Notes

External links 

emergentchaos.com Does Ryan Singel need a privacy policy?
Wired.com Threat Level blog
Wired.com Epicenter blog
Singel-Minded Singel's personal site

Single, Ryan
Living people
Singel,Ryan
American bloggers
Vassar College alumni
21st-century American non-fiction writers
American male bloggers